The 1970 Canada hurricane was an unnamed tropical cyclone that brought impact to Bermuda and Newfoundland. The fourth hurricane and ninth tropical storm of the annual hurricane season, this system developed northeast of the Bahamas as a subtropical depression on October 12. While tracking northeastward, the system intensified, becoming a subtropical storm on the following day. The subtropical storm transitioned into a tropical cyclone on October 16, and strengthened into a hurricane about twelve hours later. The hurricane later bypassed Bermuda, before further intensifying into a Category 2 hurricane on the Saffir–Simpson hurricane wind scale. Thereafter, the hurricane accelerated rapidly northeastward, and made landfall on the Avalon Peninsula of Newfoundland as a Category 1 hurricane. It transitioned into an extratropical cyclone early on October 17.

The system produced tropical storm force winds on Bermuda, which caused the suspension of schools, transportation, and interrupted businesses, although minimal structural damage occurred. Light rainfall was also reported on the island. Hurricane-force winds were observed throughout Newfoundland, which caused damage to structures, though mostly limited to broken windows. Rough seas damaged fishing dories and a fishing ramp on the Atlantic coast of the island. The cost of damage on the Burin Peninsula was estimated to be in the thousands of dollars, although the specific figure in unknown. On the French Territory of Saint Pierre and Miquelon, several buildings and houses lost their roof due to strong winds.

Meteorological history

On October 11, 1970, satellite images indicated that a tropical depression developed north of Hispaniola. However, according to post-analysis, a subtropical depression actually formed on October 12 at 1200 UTC. The depression slowly intensified over the next few days, and became a subtropical storm on October 12, thought this was operationally unnoticed by the National Hurricane Center. By October 13, satellite imagery indicated that convection associated with the depression merged with a weak stationary front. As a result, the National Hurricane Center no longer considered it purely tropical and classified the system as a "subtropic storm" on October 14. Later that day, the National Hurricane Center began issuing special bulletins for the storm, indicating the possibility of the system acquiring tropical characteristics.

Early on October 16, satellite imagery indicated that the storm was developing a cloud pattern typical of a normal tropical cyclone. In addition, Reconnaissance aircraft flight data indicated that a warm core was developing. As a result, the system had acquired enough characteristics to be considered a tropical cyclone at 0000 UTC on that day. Later that day, the storm strengthened enough to be upgraded to a hurricane at 1200 UTC. Six hours later, the system passed just west of Bermuda, although winds were well below hurricane force on the island. Spiral cloud bands and an eye feature were observed on radars as the hurricane bypassed the island. The warm core persisted into October 17, which indicated that the hurricane was fully tropical for at least 30–36 hours.

At 0600 UTC on October 17, the system intensified into a Category 2 hurricane on the Saffir–Simpson hurricane wind scale. Although a radio bulletin by the Naval Communications Station Washington, D.C. Transmitter (NSS) at 1200 UTC noted that it had hurricane characteristics, the National Hurricane Center did not name the storm. By 1800 UTC, a cold front began impacting the circulation of the hurricane, which caused the storm to weaken back to a Category 1 hurricane, and began losing its tropical characteristics. Only 30 minutes later, the hurricane transitioned into an extratropical cyclone. The remnant extratropical cyclone curved abruptly northward and later re-emerged into the Atlantic, before dissipating on October 20.

Impact
Late on October 16, the storm passed close to Bermuda as a minimal Category 1 hurricane, causing strong winds on the island. Strong winds caused the suspension of school, transportation, and disruption to businesses across Bermuda. A riot started by the recurrence of vandalism and arson plagued the island for two weeks leading up to the storm. However, merchants and police were forced to ease their anti-riot efforts to board up their windows.

Shortly before transitioning into an extratropical cyclone, the hurricane moved across the extreme southeastern portion of Newfoundland at Category 1 intensity. As a result, high winds were reported across the region; wind speeds of  occurred on the Burin Peninsula. Wind damage occurred throughout the island, although mostly limited to broken windows, trees being uprooted, and fences knocked over. In addition, a house under construction blew over in Marystown; another house was abandoned in St. John's for the fear of the roof blowing off. Hydro poles also caught fire in Burin and Grand Banks. Rough seas caused by the storm sunk or damage several fishing dories in Grand Bank and three fishing premises were washed away in Lamaline. In addition, a fishing ramp was washed out to sea in Lourdes Cove. Damage in the Burin Peninsula alone totaled to thousands of dollars, although the exact figure is unknown.

Heavy rainfall also occurred across much of the Atlantic Canada region, especially in areas well west of the path of the storm. Rainfall occurred further north into Labrador, with precipitation of at least  being reported as far north as Groswater Bay. Further south in the provinces of Prince Edward Island, Nova Scotia, and New Brunswick, rainfall amounts did not exceed . No flooding was reported in Atlantic Canada. On the offshore French Territory of Saint Pierre and Miquelon, severe wind damage was also reported on Saint-Pierre. Several homes and a church lost its roof.

See also

List of Bermuda hurricanes
List of Canada hurricanes

References

External links
Atlantic Hurricane Season Of 1970
Atlantic Tropical Systems Of 1970
The unnamed Atlantic Tropical Storms Of 1970

1970 Atlantic hurricane season
Category 2 Atlantic hurricanes
Hurricanes in Bermuda
Hurricanes in Canada